Sameen Gul Afridi (born 4 February 1999) is a Pakistani cricketer who plays for United Bank Limited. He made his first-class debut on 30 November 2015 in the 2015–16 Quaid-e-Azam Trophy. In December 2015 he was named in Pakistan's squad for the 2016 Under-19 Cricket World Cup. He made his List A debut on 20 April 2016 for Khyber Pakhtunkhwa in the 2016 Pakistan Cup. He made his Twenty20 debut on 9 September 2016 for Federally Administered Tribal Areas in the 2016–17 National T20 Cup.

In April 2018, he was named in Khyber Pakhtunkhwa's squad for the 2018 Pakistan Cup. In December 2018, he was named in Pakistan's team for the 2018 ACC Emerging Teams Asia Cup. In March 2019, he was named in Federal Areas' squad for the 2019 Pakistan Cup.

In September 2019, he was named in Khyber Pakhtunkhwa's squad for the 2019–20 Quaid-e-Azam Trophy tournament. In November 2019, he was named in Pakistan's squad for the 2019 ACC Emerging Teams Asia Cup in Bangladesh.

References

External links
 

1999 births
Living people
Pashtun people
Afridi people
Pakistani cricketers
United Bank Limited cricketers
Khyber Pakhtunkhwa cricketers
Federal Areas cricketers
Federally Administered Tribal Areas cricketers
Peshawar Zalmi cricketers
People from Khyber District